Nadzeya Malasai (born ) is a Belarusian volleyball player, playing as an outside-spiker. She is part of the Belarus women's national volleyball team. She competed at the 2015 Women's European Volleyball Championship.

Career
In the summer of 2015, Malasai moved to Greece and was transferred to Olympiacos Piraeus, where she remained until 2017. With the Red-whites of Piraeus she won the double twice (Hellenic Championship and Hellenic Cup) in the 2015–16 and 2016-17 seasons. Moreover, in 2017 she was runner up of the European Challenge Cup, in the course of Olympiacos to the final of the competition. In Summer 2018, when her contract with Olympiacos was over, she left Piraeus and transferred to Minczanka Minsk. With the Belarusian team she won the silver medal of 2017–18 European CEV Cup.

International career
Nadzeya Malasai is member of the Belarus women's national volleyball team. She started in 2007 in the youth team and was promoted to the women's group in 2009.
She has participated in several events, such as World Championship Qualifiers, European Championship Qualifiers or Finals and European League games from 2009 up to now.

Sporting achievements

International competitions
 2017  CEV Women's Challenge Cup, with Olympiacos Piraeus
 2018  Women's CEV Cup, with Minczanka Minsk

National championships
5 Belarusian Championships
 2007/2008  Belarusian Championship with Atlant Baranovitchi
 2008/2009  Belarusian Championship with Atlant Baranovitchi
 2010/2011  Belarusian Championship with Atlant Baranovitchi
 2011/2012  Belarusian Championship with Atlant Baranovitchi
 2017/2018  Belarusian Championship with Minchanka Minsk
 2012/2013  Belarusian Championship Runners up with Atlant Baranovitchi

2 Hellenic Championships
 2015/2016  Hellenic Championship, with Olympiacos Piraeus
 2016/2017  Hellenic Championship, with Olympiacos Piraeus

National trophies
 2015/2016  Hellenic Cup, with Olympiacos Piraeus
 2016/2017  Hellenic Cup, with Olympiacos Piraeus

References

External links
Malasai's Profile at greekvolley.gr
Malasai - Personal information at www.worldofvolley.com
Nadzeya Malasai in Olympiacos Piraeus - Brief Biografy www.olympiacossfp.gr
 New contract with Olympiacos Piraeus for 2016-17 season www.olympiacossfp.gr

1990 births
Living people
Belarusian women's volleyball players
Olympiacos Women's Volleyball players
Place of birth missing (living people)
Outside hitters
Expatriate volleyball players in Russia
Expatriate volleyball players in Greece
Belarusian expatriate sportspeople in Greece
Belarusian expatriate sportspeople in Russia
People from Barysaw
Sportspeople from Minsk Region